Solanum arboreum is an arborescent shrub in the family Solanaceae, which reaches a height of . It is native to Central and South America.

References 

arboreum